Kelkkaatha Sabdham is a 1982 Indian Malayalam-language drama film written and directed by Balachandra Menon and produced by Raju Mathew. The film stars Mohanlal, Nedumudi Venu, Balachandra Menon and Ambika in the lead roles. The film has musical score by Johnson. The film was a commercial success.

Plot
Babu, a womaniser, falls in love with a village girl, Jayanthi, and promises to marry her. Due to some unexpected turn of events, Babu's father does not approve of their marriage.

Cast

Mohanlal as Babu
Nedumudi Venu as Devan
Balachandra Menon as Lambodaran Nair
Ambika as Jeyanthi
Jagathy Sreekumar
Baiju as Ravikkuttan
Master Vineeth Govind as Jeyanthi's Son
C. I. Paul as Sreemangalathu Narayana Pillai
Nanditha Bose as Jeyanthi's Mother
Poornima Jayaram as Poornima
Shanthi Krishna as Sushma
Jagannatha Varma as Babu's Father

Soundtrack
The music was composed by Johnson and the lyrics were written by Devadas.

Reception
Kelkatha Shabdam was the first commercially successful production of Century Films.

References

External links
 

1982 films
1980s Malayalam-language films
Films directed by Balachandra Menon